Luigi Faure (1901 in Sauze d'Oulx – September 5, 1974) was an Italian cross-country skier, Nordic combined skier, and ski jumper who competed in the 1924 Winter Olympics in Chamonix, where he finished 17th in the total ranking of the men's normal hill event.

In the 1940s, he founded Faure sport in his home town.

Further notable results

Ski jumping 
 1924: 1st, Italian ski jumping championships 
 1925: 1st, Italian ski jumping championships
 1926: 1st, Italian ski jumping championships
 1927: 2nd, Italian ski jumping championships

Nordic combined 
 1924: 1st, Italian championships of Nordic combined skiing
 1925: 1st, Italian championships of Nordic combined skiing
 1926: 1st, Italian championships of Nordic combined skiing
 1927: 1st, Italian championships of Nordic combined skiing
 1928: 1st, Italian championships of Nordic combined skiing
 1929: 1st, Italian championships of Nordic combined skiing

Cross-country skiing 
 1924: 2nd, Italian men's championships of cross-country skiing, 18 km
 1926: 2nd, Italian men's championships of cross-country skiing, 18 km

External links
profile

References 

1901 births
1974 deaths
Italian male ski jumpers
Italian male cross-country skiers
Italian male Nordic combined skiers
Olympic ski jumpers of Italy
Ski jumpers at the 1924 Winter Olympics
People from Sauze d'Oulx 
Sportspeople from the Metropolitan City of Turin